Hannah Taunton (born 31 May 1991) is a British Paralympic athlete. She won bronze in the Women's 1500 metres T20 at the 2020 Summer Paralympics in Tokyo.

References

External links
 
 

1991 births
Living people
Paralympic athletes of Great Britain
Paralympic bronze medalists for Great Britain
Athletes (track and field) at the 2020 Summer Paralympics
Paralympic medalists in athletics (track and field)
Medalists at the 2020 Summer Paralympics
Sportspeople from Taunton
British female middle-distance runners